Uncaria gambir, the gambier or gambir, is a species of plant in the genus Uncaria found in Southeast Asia, mainly Malaysia and Indonesia.

Extract

Gambier extract is used or has been used as a catechu for chewing with areca and betel, for tanning and dyeing, and as herbal medicine. Gambier extract was also used by native people as a medical treatment or prevention of diseases that were believed to be spread by the now obsolete medical theory of miasma.

The Indians invented paan, a gambir paste, that was believed to help prevent miasma; it was considered as the first antimiasmatic application. The gambir tree is found in Southern India and Sri Lanka.

References

gambir